Trojitá is a free software IMAP and SMTP email client developed using the Qt C++ library. The design goals of the maintainers are to develop a fast e-mail client which respects open standards, is cross-platform and uses the available resources very efficiently.

Trojitá offers to manage contacts in the abook format, as introduced by the text-based user interface abook addressbook program.

In Autumn 2012, Trojitá became a part of the KDE community.

History
In 2006, the project started as a private exercise in programming of Jan Kundrát. As a part of his studies, Trojitá became a topic of the author's bachelor and master's theses, making a debut in 2009. In 2010, Jan was briefly contracted to work on Trojitá for a system integrator, but the project was cancelled for external reasons. After Jan's graduation, the governance of the project opened up and Trojitá moved beneath the KDE umbrella. As a part of the KDE community, Trojitá gained new contributors and was translated into thirty-three languages.

Since 2012, Trojitá took part in two rounds each of Google Code-In as well as Google Summer of Code competitions. As of 2016, Trojitá includes contributions from more than sixty developers.

Trojitá is the e-mail engine used for mail synchronization within the xTuple's Postbooks ERP project. It was also planned to become the e-mail engine used in the Canonical's Ubuntu Touch mobile handsets until Canonical forked the code.

Notes

References

Email clients
Email clients that use Qt
Email client software for Linux
Free email software
Portable software
Free software programmed in C++
Cross-platform free software
KDE software
Free multilingual software